Duane Milne (born 1967) is an American politician and academic who served as a Republican member of the Pennsylvania House of Representatives, representing the 167th legislative district. He was first elected in 2006.

Education 
Milne attended the College of William and Mary and earned a Doctor of Philosophy in Political Science from the University of Delaware.

Career 
He is a professor of Political Science at West Chester University and has written academic papers on federalism and public sector management. He also has worked as an organizational consultant and has gained international experience through business projects in countries throughout Asia, including China, Japan, South Korea and the Philippines.

Milne has served as an officer in the Army Reserve and is a member of the Chester County Voting Reform Commission.

References

External links 

 State Representative Duane Milne official PA House website

1967 births
Living people
21st-century American politicians
College of William & Mary alumni
Republican Party members of the Pennsylvania House of Representatives
People from Media, Pennsylvania
United States Army officers
United States Army reservists
University of Delaware alumni
West Chester University faculty
Politicians from Chester County, Pennsylvania